The Sangihe scops owl (Otus collari) is an owl species endemic to the Sangihe Island of Indonesia.

References

BirdLife Species Factsheet - Sangihe Scops-owl
Owl pages

Sangihe scops owl
Birds of the Sangihe Islands
Endemic birds of Sulawesi
Sangihe scops owl
Sangihe scops owl
Sangihe scops owl